The Delaware–Maryland–Pennsylvania Tri-State Point is the meeting of the northwestern corner of Delaware, the northeastern corner of Maryland, and the southern edge of Pennsylvania. A wooden marker was placed in 1765, by Charles Mason and Jeremiah Dixon, and was replaced with a stone marker in 1849. A trail to the marker was made in 2014–2015.

History
Mason and Dixon placed a wooden marker on the tri-point on June 6, 1765. It was replaced in 1849 by a stone marker.  At one point, the marker went missing, so Lt. Col. Graham, of the U.S. Corps of Topographical Engineers, was sent out to replace it. He located the marker, but replaced it in the wrong location. In 1892, W.C. Hodgkins was sent to resurvey the area, and he fixed the location of the marker.

Tri-State Marker Trail
The marker was hard to access, as it was on private land, so in December 2011, Pennsylvania bought the land on the Pennsylvania side of the marker, while the Delaware and Maryland sides remained as private lands. A plan for a four mile trail to the marker, the Tri-State Trail, progressed in 2012 and 2013. The Northern Trail, or Phase 1, was finished in 2014, and the Southern Trail, or Phase 2, was finished in 2015.

References

See also
Wedge (border)

Borders of Delaware
Borders of Maryland
Borders of Pennsylvania
Cultural boundaries
Surveying of the United States
Historic Civil Engineering Landmarks